The Singapore national football team represents Singapore in the senior men's international football. It is organised by the Football Association of Singapore (FAS), the governing body of football in Singapore, which is affiliated with the Asian Football Confederation (AFC) and the regional ASEAN Football Federation (AFF). The current head coach is Takayuki Nishigaya. The team's colours are red and white. Singapore are colloquially known as "The Lions".

Singapore has one of the oldest national teams in Asia, with the FAS being the oldest football association in the continent itself. Despite the country having a relatively small population pool, it has generally punched above its weight by successively producing squads that has fiercely competed with its larger and much more populated neighbours.

This can be seen in its most significant successes, which have come in the regional AFF Championship, whereby Singapore had won four times in 1998, 2004–05, 2007, and 2012. Singapore was the first team to achieve this feat and the only team to win in all the finals that they had played. In 1998, Singapore defeated Vietnam in the final to capture the country's first major international football title. In the 2004–05 competition, Singapore defeated Indonesia in a two-leg final 5–2 on aggregate. Singapore retained the trophy in 2007, beating Thailand 3–2 on aggregate in the final. In 2012, Singapore won the trophy a record 4th time, again defeating three-time champions Thailand 3–2 on aggregate in the final.

Singapore has also achieved notable results beyond its sub-confederation. In the 2007 AFC Asian Cup qualification, Singapore became the only team to beat Iraq where Iraq was en route to their Asian Cup-winning campaign. Singapore also drew with China 0–0 and 1–1 at home in 2006 and 2009 respectively. In March 2008, Australia also failed to beat Singapore when the game ended in a goalless draw. During the 2018 FIFA World Cup qualifiers, Japan was held to a draw at home at the Saitama Stadium by Singapore, being the only game where they had dropped points in the group.

History

1892–1994 

In 1892, the Singapore Amateur Football Association applied to become a registered society. The HMS Malaya Cup (which was later known as the Malaysia Cup) was launched in 1921 by officers of a British battleship in Malaya, and Singapore was one of the six teams that took part in the inaugural year, and won the event. While the representative side in the Malaysia Cup and the Malaysian League was not the national team per se – this team included some foreign players as it is more of a club side – many Singapore football fans viewed the Singapore Lions club side as being almost synonymous to the national team as well. They either won or were runners up in the event every year until 1941, after which it was suspended because of World War II.

Overall, Singapore won 24 Malaysia Cup titles and two Malaysian League titles. After winning the Malaysia Cup and league double in 1994, the Football Association of Singapore withdrew from the Malaysian competitions following a dispute with the Football Association of Malaysia over gate receipts. Singapore subsequently launched its own professional league, the S.League, in 1996, and also began to put much more focus on the performance of its national team in international competitions. 

At that time, Singapore hosted their first and so far, its only international competition, the 1984 AFC Asian Cup. The team was eliminated from the group stage with four points, a 2–0 win over India and a 1–1 draw to giant Iran. In the FIFA World Rankings, Singapore's highest standing was in the first release of the figures, in August 1993, at 73rd.

1995–1999 
Singapore won the bronze medal in the 1995 Southeast Asian Games, after losing 0–1 in the semi-finals to the hosts and eventual gold medalists, Thailand. Singapore hosted the inaugural AFF Championship (then known as Tiger Cup) in 1996 but were eliminated in the group stages.

The national team again reached the semi-finals of the Southeast Asian Games in 1997, losing to Indonesia, and lost to Vietnam 0–1 in the third-place match.

However, in the 1998 edition of the AFF Championship, Singapore's team led by coach Barry Whitbread won the group stage with victories over Malaysia and the Philippines. In the semi-finals, they beat Indonesia and subsequently edged out hosts Vietnam 1–0 in the final. This was the country's first ever international title.

2000–2002 
Jan B. Poulsen, who was part of Denmark's backroom staff at the 1998 World Cup, was appointed the Technical Director of the Football Association of Singapore in 1999. Due to poor results by Singapore in the 2000 AFF Championship, coach Vincent Subramaniam was sacked and Poulsen took over as coach in December 2000. Singapore hosted the 2002 AFF Championship, but lost 0–4 to arch-rivals Malaysia in their first game. Before the game, local newspaper The New Paper was encouraging fans to turn up in numbers. After the game, the Lions attributed their heavy defeat to the unexpected large crowd. Singapore went on to win 2–1 over Laos, but a 1–1 draw in the final group game against Thailand was not enough for them to reach the knock-out stages. Poulsen was sacked after the tournament.

2003–2004 (AFF Championship) 
Radojko Avramović took over as coach of the flailing and deflated Singapore national football team in July 2003. Singapore started the 2004 AFF Championship as underdogs but a 1–1 draw in their first game against hosts Vietnam, another draw against Indonesia, and wins against Cambodia and Laos saw them qualify for the semi-finals.

Singapore were drawn against Myanmar in the two-legged semi-finals. Singapore took a 4–3 away lead back home for the second leg. In the ill-tempered second leg, three Myanmar players were sent off and a reserve Myanmar goalkeeper even threw a water bottle at defender S. Subramani. Singapore went on to win 4–2 after extra time for an 8–5 aggregate victory.

Singapore then won the first leg of the two-legged final against Indonesia 3–1 in Jakarta, before winning 2–1 (5–2 on aggregate) in the second leg in front of a strong 55,000 home crowd at the former National Stadium.

2007 Asian Cup Qualifiers 
In 2006, Avramovic then led Singapore into the 2007 Asian Cup qualifiers with a 2–0 victory at home over Iraq, but Singapore failed to build on this victory and then lost away to Palestine. The Singapore team then took on China away in Tianjin and lost to an injury time penalty. China travelled to Singapore for the second meeting and the Singapore defence held out for a 0–0 draw. A subsequent 2–4 loss to Iraq dashed Singapore's hopes of qualifying for the Asian Cup. The Asian Cup qualifying campaign ended with a default 3–0 victory over Palestine, who were unable to fulfil the fixture.

2007 AFF Championship 
Singapore hosted the group stages of the 2007 AFF Championship. After a 0–0 draw with Vietnam, Singapore then thrashed Laos 11–0 to record their largest-ever win. In the final group match, Singapore knocked Indonesia out of the tournament in a 2–2 draw. Singapore met Malaysia in the semi-final. The first leg saw a 1–1 draw in Shah Alam, while in the second leg at Singapore's National Stadium, following another 1–1 draw, Singapore beat Malaysia in a penalty shoot-out 5–4, goalkeeper Lionel Lewis saving the final Malaysian spot kick from Mohd Khyril Muhymeen Zambri. In the final against Thailand, Singapore won a controversial first leg at home 2–1, then secured a 1–1 draw in Bangkok thanks to a late strike from Khairul Amri to retain the AFF Championship trophy.

2008 AFF Championship 
In the 2008 AFF Championship co-hosted by Indonesia and Thailand, Singapore was drawn in Group A to against Indonesia, Myanmar and Cambodia. Singapore progressed from the group as winners. However, they lost out to eventual winners Vietnam 0–1 on aggregate.

2010 World Cup Qualifiers 
Singapore met Palestine in the first round of the 2010 FIFA World Cup Asian Qualifying Tournament. Singapore won the first leg 4–0 away in Doha, and the Palestinians again failed to fulfil the away fixture, so FIFA awarded Singapore a 3–0 win.

Singapore was drawn with Tajikistan in the second round: Singapore won the home match 2–0 and drew the return leg 1–1 on 18 November to progress to the third round of the Asian Qualifying Tournament for the first time, where they were drawn against Saudi Arabia, Lebanon and Uzbekistan.

Singapore's group stage campaign began with a loss to Saudi Arabia, but the Lions then beat Lebanon 2–0 at home. Successive losses to Uzbekistan, 3–7 and 0–1, left Singapore with little chance of getting into the next round. Singapore were finally eliminated when they lost 0–2 to the Saudis at home.

FIFA later awarded Saudi Arabia and Uzbekistan both a 3–0 win, where they won 2–0 and 1–0 respectively, due to Singapore fielding Qiu Li, who is not eligible to represent Singapore.

Singapore finished third in the group with six points from six games after defeating Lebanon 2–1 in Beirut in their final game. With the elimination, Goal 2010 was ended.

2011 Asian Cup Qualification 
For the 2011 AFC Asian Cup qualification, Singapore was drawn in Group E, together with Iran, Thailand and Jordan. Singapore were beaten 0–6 by Iran in the first match, and then defeated Jordan 2–1. In November 2009, Singapore hosted Thailand at the National Stadium and lost 3–1, but won the return fixture 1–0 a few days later, earning Singapore their first victory on Thai soil in 48 years. Singapore next hosted Iran, losing 1–3, and the 1–2 defeat against Jordan which followed ended their hopes of Asian Cup football in 2011. The players reported some teammates were smoking during halftime in the match against Jordan.

2010 AFF Championship 
In 2010, Singapore drew with the Philippines 1–1, defeated Myanmar 2–1, then duly lost to Vietnam 0–1 in the knockout stage decider. As a result, the Singapore national football team was knocked out of the group stage in Hanoi. The Lions were criticised for their dismal performances in the AFF Championship, which they won in 1998, 2004, and 2007.

2011–2012 
In January 2011, the FAS decided to disband and revamp the national team. Six months later, The Lions were back in action after the dismal performances in 2010. In May 2011, national team coach Raddy Avramovic announced the new 33-strong national provisional squad for the upcoming international friendlies and 2014 FIFA World Cup qualification campaign. The Lions were scheduled to play international friendlies against Maldives on 7 June 2011 and Laos on 18 July 2011.

Few days after releasing the provisional 33-man squad, national team training started in preparation of the match against Maldives. Avramovic led the new-look Lions in a game where Singapore won Maldives 4–0 at the Jalan Besar Stadium, Singapore in a friendly match. (Note. The match was not an 'A' international because unlimited substitutions were allowed.)

After the 4–0 win against Maldives, a closed-door friendly match against Etoile FC (of the S.League) was played at the Jalan Besar Stadium, in which the Lions were triumphant thanks to goals from Aleksandar Duric and Qiu Li. Less than a week later before the World Cup qualifier, a final friendly was played against Chinese Taipei. Singapore won the match 3–2 with goals from Aleksandar Duric, Shi Jiayi and Fazrul Nawaz.

In preparation for the third round of the World Cup Qualifiers, the Lions played a friendly non-'A' match against Thailand before their opening qualifier against China. The friendly finished 0–0.

The Singapore national team took part in the 10th edition of the Sultan of Selangor Cup, usually contested by the Singapore Selection. They beat the Selangor Selection 1–0. This was also Singapore's sixth time winning the Sultan of Selangor Cup. They then took on but was defeated by the Philippines 0–2 in a friendly.

Few months later, Coach Raddy Avramovic announced a new 27-man squad for the national team comprising mostly players from LionsXII.

2014 FIFA World Cup Qualifier (Asian Qualifier) 
Singapore received a bye to the second round of 2014 FIFA World Cup qualification in 2011 because of their accession to the third round of the qualifying in the previous World Cup.

Their second round opponents were regional rivals Malaysia, whom they beat 5–3 in the first leg with goals from Aleksandar Duric, Qiu Li, Mustafic Fahrudin and Shi Jiayi. The second leg was held at the National Stadium, Bukit Jalil on 28 July 2011. A 1–1 draw thanks to a key Shi Jiayi goal in the second half was enough to put Singapore through to the 3rd Round of Asian Zone World Cup 2014 Qualifying.

In the preliminary draw in Brazil on 30 July 2011 by the football governing body FIFA, Singapore was drawn into Group A for their Round 3 of the Asian qualifiers with Jordan, Iraq and China.

Singapore kicked off the third round with a 1–2 loss to China in Kunming. They then succumbed to a second defeat, 0–2, against Iraq. The next match was slated to be held at Jalan Besar Stadium, Singapore on 11 October against Jordan which Singapore lost 0–3. A 0–2 defeat to Jordan in Amman killed off the Lions' chances of progress. Singapore ended the year with a 0–4 defeat at home to China PR, their 5th consecutive loss. Iraq then dealt the Singapore team a heavy 1–7 loss in Doha, Qatar, with Singapore bowing out with no wins.

In 2012, Singapore started their tournament with a 3–0 win over close rivals Malaysia. They then lost 0–1 to Indonesia before winning 4–3 in the knockout stage decider against Laos. to top the group and qualify for the semi-finals.

Against the Philippines in the semi-finals, Singapore won 1–0 on aggregate. The solitary goal from Khairul Amri during the home leg of the semi-finals was enough to set up a meeting with Thailand in the finals.

The Lions won the first leg of the finals 3–1 in Singapore. Despite losing the away leg 0–1, Singapore was able to pick up the 2012 AFF Championship, their fourth championship. Singapore holds the record for the highest number of AFF Championship titles. Raddy Avramovic ended his tenure as Singapore coach after the tournament.

2015 Asian Cup Qualification 
For the 2015 AFC Asian Cup qualification, Singapore was drawn in Group A, together with Jordan, Syria and Oman. Singapore were beaten 0–4 by Jordan in the first match, and then loss to Jordan with a scoreline of 0–2. In October 2013, Singapore hosted Syria at the Jalan Besar Stadium and with their first win of the campaign with a 2–1 victory thanks to Gabriel Quak's late winner which was also his first international goal. But a month later, Syria won Singapore in the return fixture 0–4. Singapore next hosted Jordan, losing 1–3, and the 1–3 defeat against Oman which followed ended their hopes of Asian Cup football in 2015.

2013–2014 
The FAS announced on 15 May 2013 that they had appointed German Bernd Stange as the new head coach of the national team.

On 27 May 2013, Stange announced his choice of 23 players for the friendlies against Myanmar and Laos on 4 June 2013 and 7 June 2013 respectively. The squad featured several new players who were called up to the national squad for the first time, including 17-year-old Adam Swandi. LionsXII midfielders Gabriel Quak and Faris Ramli and Tanjong Pagar United's winger Hafiz Nor also received their first national call-ups.

Veteran forward Indra Sahdan was also recalled to the national team. He took the captain's armband on 4 June 2013 for coach Stange's first game against Myanmar which Singapore won 2–0. He also scored the first goal in the second friendly match against Laos, which saw Singapore with a 5–2 victory.

Following the two wins, Singapore's FIFA World Rankings rose nine places to 156 in July 2013.

Stange registered his first international competition win on 15 October 2013 against Syria.

Stange had been trying to inculcate the one-touch, quick-tempo style of play for into the Singapore team, and gear the team up for the 2014 AFF Championship and try to retain the AFF Championship.

Michel Sablon, the man credited for Belgium's rise in football, has been unveiled as the new technical director of the Football Association of Singapore too.

2014 AFF Championship 
The Lions entered the 2014 AFF Championship as the defending champions trying to defend the cup on home soil, but their title defence was spoiled with a 1–2 defeat over Thailand, which they also faced back in 2012. Then, they beat Myanmar 4–2 before bowing out after suffering a 1–3 defeat to rivals Malaysia. The Lions finished with 3 points and 3rd in Group B, and are the first team in the history of the AFF Championship to bow out from the group stage as the defending champions.

2018 FIFA World Cup Qualifier (2019 AFC Asian Cup Qualifier) 
The Lions kick started their campaign with an away game against Cambodia on 11 June 2015 which ended 4–0 in favour of Singapore. Following which, they travelled to Saitama Stadium in Japan where they held the hosts to a  goalless draw. However, they were defeated by Syria 0–1, at the Sultan Qaboos Sports Complex in Muscat, Oman, marking their first loss in the group stages of the tournament. The Lions then beat Afghanistan by a scoreline of 1–0 and their 2nd consecutive win against Cambodia, winning the game 2–1. However, the winning streak ended when they faced Japan at home, and were defeated 0–3. They then went on to face Syria, which was a tight game. Khribin of Syria scored on the 20th minute and were 0-1 up. Safuwan of Singapore scored a late equaliser on the 89th minute but Singapore could not hold on to the draw which ended Khribin again scoring on the 3rd minute of added time after the 90th minute, this resulted in a 1–2 loss to Singapore. Singapore played their final game against Afghanistan and were defeated 1–2. Singapore finished in third place in the table with a total points of 10.

2016 
In April 2016, a month after the match against Afghanistan, the FAS announced that Bernd Stange contract would not be renewed and he left the Singapore national football team. After a few months of Stange's departure, FAS announced the new caretaker coach was to be then Tampines Rovers head coach V. Sundramoorthy.

Sundram's first major tournament was the 2016 AYA Bank Cup in June where the team won host Myanmar and went on to the finals against Vietnam. In that match, the two teams drew after 90 mins and went on to extra time where Singapore conceded 3 goals to clinch second.

After a few months, Sundram and FAS arranged the long-awaited Causeway Challenge against Singapore's rival, Malaysia. In that match, Singapore created a lot of chances and dominated the game but was unfortunate to end the game with a 0–0 draw.

In 2016, Sundram also called up a few uncapped players like Syazwan Buhari, Khairulhin Khalid, Irfan Fandi, Abdil Qaiyyim, Shawal Anuar, Azhar Sairudin and Amy Recha. Many of which has at least one cap to their name. Although Hami Syahin was not called up for any matches, he was registered in the 40 man provisional squad for the 2016 AFF Championship. Sundram also recalled several players like Daniel Bennett, Mustafic Fahrudin, Zulfadli Zainal and Hafiz Nor. Ridhuan Muhammad was not recalled for any matches but was registered in the 40-man provisional squad for the 2016 AFF Championship. Sundram also gave chances to the two players, Shahfiq Ghani and Shahdan Sulaiman who both just recovered from long-term injuries to prove themselves.

2016 AFF Championship 
In 2016, Singapore was grouped with ASEAN giants, Thailand together with Indonesia and Philippines and was grouped in the "Group of Death" as the teams in this group were tough. Singapore then started their tournament with a 0–0 draw over Philippines. They then lost 0–1 to Thailand where Thailand's Sarawut Masuk scored a late winner in the 89th minute. Singapore actually needed at least a draw with Indonesia and Thailand have to beat Philippines to qualify for the semi-finals. It was great news in the first half as Singapore was leading 1–0 but Singapore's defence went to sleep and conceded 2 late goals for Indonesia to qualify for the semi-finals. Singapore ended their 2016 AFF Championship at the bottom of the table.

2019 AFC Asian Cup qualification – Third Round 

Singapore started their 2019 AFC Asian Cup qualification – Third Round campaign against Bahrain on 28 March 2017. Singapore drew with Bahrain with a score-line of 0–0. In Singapore's next game, they went on to play against Chinese Taipei where they lost 1–2 at home with Singapore's vice-captain Hariss Harun scoring and Xavier Chen and Chen Chao-an scoring for the visitors.

Singapore's head coach V. Sundramoorthy introduced a National Team Day where Mondays are for players who are called up for a short meeting and tactical training session in the pitch. In this call up, Sundram recalled players like Raihan Rahman. Sundram also called up the uncapped Ho Wai Loon tas a standby player for matches against Afghanistan and Bahrain. Sundram also called up uncapped Muhaimin Suhaimi for the friendly against Myanmar, the 2019 Asian Cup Qualifiers against Chinese Taipei and the friendly against Argentina. They made history for not winning any match in a year, reaching the lowest FIFA ranking ever of 173rd placing. Singapore finished bottom of the group with 2 points, losing the final match 1–0 to secure home-and-away losses against Chinese Taipei on 26 March 2018.

Team image

Kits

There have been different suppliers for the jerseys, from Admiral, Puma, Umbro, Grand Sport to Tiger. As of 2022, Nike is the supplier for the national team.

Singapore had initially worn blue shirts and shorts as their home kit. However, in the late 1980s, The Lions adopted the national colours of red and white for their home kit while they kept blue as the colour for the away kit. This tradition stayed on through the 1990s. For the 2007 AFF Championship, the national team's colours reverted to blue as its home kit and white as the other kit.

Before 2006, Singapore had been using the same kit for nearly 5 years, supplied by Tiger who had a tie-in with Diadora. The kit used during the 2007 AFF Championship made its final appearance on 4 February 2007 against Thailand. The next kit was first used on 24 June 2007 against DPR Korea. The jersey has white trims at the edge of the sleeves and around the neck. Unlike most national teams which use the country's footballing association as a logo on the kit, the national flag of Singapore takes up the spot on the left chest instead while a white Nike logo is on the right chest and this symmetry also applies to the away jersey. The numbering and lettering font and colour is the same as the previous two home jerseys.

In 2008, tight-fit jerseys were revealed in the two traditional team colours: red for the home games and blue for the away matches. The kit was worn for the first time by the national team in the international friendly against Australia in preparation for the World Cup 2010 qualifier home game against Lebanon on 26 March 2008.

In November 2010, Nike launched a new football kit for Singapore, specially made for the 2010 AFF Championship. The home kit's design was of half dark red and light red. The away kit features half navy blue and light blue that was once worn by Singapore football team in 1970's era. In recent years, the national team kits would often also include the FAS logo, either exclusively or along with the Singapore flag.

The 2022 to 2024 jerseys were worn for the first time during the team's friendly against Maldives on 17 December 2022, which they won 3–1. This is also the team's jersey for the 2022 AFF Championship.

Home stadium
From 1932 until the National Stadium was opened in 1973, Jalan Besar Stadium hosted all home games of Singapore's representative sides which participated in the Malaysia Cup.  Since then, all of Singapore's home games in the Malaysia Cup and the national team home matches were played at the National Stadium.

However, the National Stadium was slated for demolishment in 2010 to make way for the new Singapore Sports Hub which was completed in 2014. Singapore played Australia in what was planned to be the last game ever to be played at that stadium. However, due to some delays caused by the addition of new plans for the Singapore Sports Hub, the National Stadium continued to host 5 more matches, and it was also the venue for 2 more World Cup 2010 qualifier matches. While the stadium was being rebuilt as part of the new Sports Hub, the Singapore national team played its home games at the Jalan Besar Stadium, sharing it with the LionsXII and the Cubs (U15 and U16 teams).

Since the start of 2004, Singapore has played its home matches in 7 different stadiums all over Singapore.

Results and fixtures

2022

2023

Coaching staff

Coaching history

  Lim Yong Liang (1936–1941)
  Rahim Sattar (1960–1963)
  Harith Omar (1963–1965)
  Choo Seng Quee (1964–1967, 1971, 1976–1977)
  Yap Boon Chuan (1968–1971)
  Mick Walker (1972–1974)
  Ibrahim Awang (1974–1975)
  Trevor Hartley (1975–1976)
  Sebastian Yap (1977–1978)
  Jita Singh (1979–1984, 1989)
  Hussein Aljunied (1984–1986)
  Seak Poh Leong (1987–1988)
 / Robin Chan (1990–1992)
  Milouš Kvaček (1992)
  P.N. Sivaji (1992–1993)
  Ken Worden (1994)
 / Douglas Moore (1994–1995)
  Barry Whitbread (1995–1998)
  Vincent Subramaniam (1998–2000)
  Jan B. Poulsen (2000–2003)
  Radojko Avramović (2003–2012)
  V. Sundramoorthy (2013, 2016–2018)
  Bernd Stange (2013–2016)
  Fandi Ahmad (2018)
  Nazri Nasir (interim) (2019, 2022)
  Tatsuma Yoshida (2019–2021)
  Takayuki Nishigaya (2022–present)

Coaching statistics 

The following table provides a summary of the Singapore national team under each coach. Includes both competitive and friendly matches.

Players

Current squad 
The following 22 players were selected for the final Singapore squad named for the March 2023 friendlies..  Irfan Fandi withdraw from the squad due to club commitment. 

Caps and goals updated as of 3 Jan 2023, after the match against .

Recent call-ups 
The following players have also been called up in the last 24 months to the Singapore squad.

 
 
  

 WD 
   
 
 
 
 
 
 
 
 WD

 
  
  
 
 INJ
 
 
 

 
 
  
 INJ
 
  

Notes:
 COV Player out due to COVID / COVID warning
 INJ Player withdrew from the squad due to an injury
 PRE Preliminary squad
 STA Player on standby
 SUS Player suspended
 RET Retired from the national team
 WD Player withdrew from the squad

Player records

Players in bold are still active with Singapore.

Most appearances

NB The list is incomplete as Samad Allapitchay and Dollah Kassim each, reportedly, have over a hundred caps - however exact figures are still being researched.

Top goalscorers

Competitive record

FIFA World Cup

AFC Asian Cup

Asian Games

AFF Championship

SEA Games record

Head-to-head record
Below is a list of matches of Singapore's matches against FIFA-recognised teams.

Honours 
Regional
 AFF Championship
Champions (4): 1998, 2004, 2007, 2012
 Third place: 2008, 2020
 Southeast Asian Games
 Silver medalists (3): 1983, 1985, 1989
 Bronze medalists (4): 1975, 1991, 1993, 1995

Minor Titles
 AYA Bank Cup
 Runners-up (1): 2016
  AirMarine Cup
 Runners-up (1): 2019
 Tri-Nation Series 
 Champions (1): 2022

See also 

 Singapore national under-23 football team
 Singapore national youth football team
 Young Lions
 Singapore women's national football team

Notes and references

Notes

References

External links 
 The Football Association of Singapore

 
Asian national association football teams